Luiz Garcia Jr. (born May 4, 1971) is a Brazilian race car driver born in Brasilia. He began his racing career in karting, where he won three Brazilian titles (1986, 1987, 1988) and two runner-ups. He raced in the Brazilian Formula Ford 1600 in 1990 and 1991, in which he would become champion in his sophomore season, and British Formula Vauxhall in 1992 and 1993. In 1994 and 1995, he raced on European Formula 3. He then raced in the Indy Lights series in 1997 and 1998 finishing 13th and 12th in series points in his two seasons, capturing a single win in 1998 at Cleveland. He made his CART debut at the 1999 season opener at Homestead-Miami Speedway for Dale Coyne Racing. After 7 races with Coyne he moved to Hogan Racing where he made three more starts. In 2000 he returned and ran a full season in the #25 Arciero Project Racing Group Reynard-Mercedes sponsored by Brazilian companies Hollywood and Embratel. He scored 6 points, good enough for 27th in the championship, with a best finish of 11th at the Michigan 500. He returned for the first two races of the 2001 season with Coyne before poor finishes and a lack of funding ended his CART career. He has not driven in a major professional auto race since his last CART appearance.

Racing record

American open-wheel racing results
(key)

CART

External links
Luiz Garcia Jr. website (updated to 1998)
CART statistics at ChampCarStats.com

1971 births
Brazilian racing drivers
Champ Car drivers
Brazilian IndyCar Series drivers
Indy Lights drivers
Stock Car Brasil drivers
Living people
Sportspeople from Brasília

Hogan Racing drivers
Dale Coyne Racing drivers
British Formula Three Championship drivers
Super Nova Racing drivers